The concept of the evolution of morality refers to the emergence of human moral behavior over the course of human evolution. Morality can be defined as a system of ideas about right and wrong conduct. In everyday life, morality is typically associated with human behavior rather than animal behavior. The emerging fields of evolutionary biology, and in particular evolutionary psychology, have argued that, despite the complexity of human social behaviors, the precursors of human morality can be traced to the behaviors of many other social animals. Sociobiological explanations of human behavior remain controversial. Social scientists have traditionally viewed morality as a construct, and thus as culturally relative, although others such as Sam Harris argue that there is an objective science of morality.

Animal sociality

Though other animals may not possess what humans may perceive as moral behavior, all social animals have had to modify or restrain their behaviors for group living to be worthwhile. Typical examples of behavioral modification can be found in the societies of ants, bees and termites. Ant colonies may possess millions of individuals. E. O. Wilson argues that the single most important factor that leads to the success of ant colonies is the existence of a sterile worker caste. This caste of females are subservient to the needs of their mother, the queen, and in so doing, have given up their own reproduction in order to raise brothers and sisters. The existence of sterile castes among these social insects significantly restricts the competition for mating and in the process fosters cooperation within a colony. Cooperation among ants is vital, because a solitary ant has an improbable chance of long-term survival and reproduction. However, as part of a group, colonies can thrive for decades. As a consequence, ants are one of the most successful families of species on the planet, accounting for a biomass that rivals that of the human species.

The basic reason that social animals live in groups is that opportunities for survival and reproduction are much better in groups than living alone. The social behaviors of mammals are more familiar to humans. Highly social mammals such as primates and elephants have been known to exhibit traits that were once thought to be uniquely human, like empathy and altruism.

Primate sociality 

Humanity's closest living relatives are common chimpanzees and bonobos. These primates share a common ancestor with humans who lived four to six million years ago. It is for this reason that chimpanzees and bonobos are viewed as the best available surrogate for this common ancestor. Barbara King argues that while primates may not possess morality in the human sense, they do exhibit some traits that would have been necessary for the evolution of morality. These traits include high intelligence, a capacity for symbolic communication, a sense of social norms,  realization of "self", and a concept of continuity.
Frans de Waal and Barbara King both view human morality as having grown out of primate sociality.
Many social animals such as primates, dolphins, and whales have shown to exhibit what Michael Shermer refers to as premoral sentiments. According to Shermer, the following characteristics are shared by humans and other social animals, particularly the great apes:

 attachment and bonding, cooperation and mutual aid, sympathy and empathy, direct and indirect reciprocity, altruism and reciprocal altruism, conflict resolution and peacemaking, deception and deception detection, community concern and caring about what others think about you, and awareness of and response to the social rules of the group.

Shermer argues that these premoral sentiments evolved in primate societies as a method of restraining individual selfishness and building more cooperative groups. For any social species, the benefits of being part of an altruistic group should outweigh the benefits of individualism. For example, lack of group cohesion could make individuals more vulnerable to attack from outsiders. Being part of a group may also improve the chances of finding food. This is evident among animals that hunt in packs to take down large or dangerous prey.

All social animals have societies in which each member knows its own place. Social order is maintained by certain rules of expected behavior and dominant group members enforce order through punishment. However, higher order primates also have a sense of reciprocity. Chimpanzees remember who did them favors and who did them wrong. For example, chimpanzees are more likely to share food with individuals who have previously groomed them. Vampire bats also demonstrate a sense of reciprocity and altruism. They share blood by regurgitation, but do not share randomly. They are most likely to share with other bats who have shared with them in the past or who are in dire need of feeding.

Animals such as Capuchin monkeys and dogs also display an understanding of fairness, refusing to co-operate when presented unequal rewards for the same behaviors.

Chimpanzees live in fission-fusion groups that average 50 individuals. It is likely that early ancestors of humans lived in groups of similar size. Based on the size of extant hunter gatherer societies, recent paleolithic hominids lived in bands of a few hundred individuals.  As community size increased over the course of human evolution, greater enforcement to achieve group cohesion would have been required. Morality may have evolved in these bands of 100 to 200 people as a means of social control, conflict resolution and group solidarity. This numerical limit is theorized to be hard coded in our genes since even modern humans have difficulty maintaining stable social relationships with more than 100–200 people.  According to Dr. de Waal, human morality has two extra levels of sophistication that are not found in other primate societies. Humans enforce their society's moral codes much more rigorously with rewards, punishments and reputation building. People also apply a degree of judgment and reason not seen in the animal kingdom.

Adaptive valley of disgust at cruel individual altruism
Some evolutionary biologists and game theorists argue that since gradual evolutionary models of morality require incremental evolution of altruism in populations where egoism and cruelty initially reigned, any sense of occasional altruism from otherwise egoistic and cruel individuals being worse than consistent cruelty would have made evolution of morality impossible due to early stages of moral evolution being selected against by such sentiments causing the individuals with some morality to be treated worse than those with no morality. This would have caused low degree morality to become an adaptive valley that would preclude the early steps away from the no morality condition, precluding an early necessary condition for later evolution of higher degrees of morality. These scientists argue that while this rules out evolutionary explanations of the specific type of morality that feels disgust at some empathy from rarely empathic individuals by assuming it to be psychopathic Machiavellianism, it does not rule out evolution of other types of morality that accept a little altruism as better than no altruism at all.

The punishment problems
While groups may benefit from avoiding certain behaviors, those harmful behaviors have the same effect regardless of whether the offending individuals are aware of them or not. Since the individuals themselves can increase their reproductive success by doing many of them, any characteristics that entail impunity are positively selected by evolution. Specifically punishing individuals aware of their breach of rules would select against the ability to be aware of it, precluding any coevolution of both conscious choice and a sense of it being the basis for moral and penal liability in the same species.

Human social intelligence
The social brain hypothesis, detailed by R.I.M Dunbar in the article The Social Brain Hypothesis and Its Implications for Social Evolution, supports the fact that the brain originally evolved to process factual information. The brain allows an individual to recognize patterns, perceive speech, develop strategies to circumvent ecologically-based problems such as foraging for food, and also permits the phenomenon of color vision. Furthermore, having a large brain is a reflection of the large cognitive demands of complex social systems. It is said that in humans and primates the neocortex is responsible for reasoning and consciousness. Therefore, in social animals, the neocortex came under intense selection to increase in size to improve social cognitive abilities. Social animals, such as humans are capable of two important concepts, coalition formation, or group living, and tactical deception, which is a tactic of presenting false information to others. The fundamental importance of animal social skills lies within the ability to manage relationships and in turn, the ability to not just commit information to memory, but manipulate it as well. An adaptive response to the challenges of social interaction and living is theory of mind. Theory of mind as defined by Martin Brüne, is the ability to infer another individual's mental states or emotions. Having a strong theory of mind is tied closely with possessing advanced social intelligence. Collectively, group living requires cooperation and generates conflict. Social living puts strong evolutionary selection pressures on acquiring social intelligence due to the fact that living in groups has advantages. Advantages to group living include protection from predators and the fact that groups in general outperform the sum of an individual's performance. But, from an objective point of view, group living also has disadvantages, such as, competition from within the group for resources and mates. This sets the stage for something of an evolutionary arms race from within the species.

Within populations of social animals, altruism, or acts of behavior that are disadvantageous to one individual while benefiting other group members, has evolved. This notion seems to be contradictory to evolutionary thought, due to the fact that an organism's fitness and success is defined by its ability to pass genes on to the next generation. According to E. Fehr, in the article, The Nature of Human Altruism, the evolution of altruism can be accounted for when kin selection and inclusive fitness are taken into account; meaning reproductive success is not just dependent on the number of offspring an individual produces, but also the number of offspring that related individuals produce. Outside of familial relationships altruism is also seen, but in a different manner typically defined by the prisoner's dilemma, theorized by John Nash. The prisoner's dilemma serves to define cooperation and defecting with and against individuals driven by incentive, or in Nash's proposed case, years in jail. In evolutionary terms, the best strategy to use for the prisoner's dilemma is tit-for-tat. In the tit-for-tat strategy, an individual should cooperate as long others are cooperating, and not defect until another individual defects against them. At their core, complex social interactions are driven by the need to distinguish sincere cooperation and defection.

Brune details that theory of mind has been traced back to primates, but it is not observed to the extent that it is in the modern human. The emergence of this unique trait is perhaps where the divergence of the modern human begins, along with our acquisition of language. Humans use metaphors and imply much of what we say. Phrases such as, "You know what I mean?" are not uncommon and are direct results of the sophistication of the human theory of mind. Failure to understand another's intentions and emotions can yield inappropriate social responses and are often associated with human mental conditions such as autism, schizophrenia, bipolar disorder, some forms of dementia, and psychopathy. This is especially true for autism spectrum disorders, where social disconnect is evident, but non-social intelligence can be preserved or even in some cases augmented, such as in the case of a savant. The need for social intelligence surrounding theory of mind is a possible answer to the question as to why morality has evolved as a part of human behavior.

Evolution of religion

Psychologist Matt J. Rossano muses that religion emerged after morality and built upon morality by expanding the social scrutiny of individual behavior to include supernatural agents. By including ever watchful ancestors, spirits and gods in the social realm, humans discovered an effective strategy for restraining selfishness and building more cooperative groups. The adaptive value of religion would have enhanced group survival.

Wason selection task

In an experiment where subjects must demonstrate abstract, complex reasoning, researchers have found that humans (as has been seen in other animals) have a strong innate ability to reason about social exchanges. This ability is believed to be intuitive, since the logical rules do not seem to be accessible to the individuals for use in situations without moral overtones.

Emotion 

Disgust, one of the basic emotions, may have an important role in certain forms of morality. Disgust is argued to be a specific response to certain things or behaviors that are dangerous or undesirable from an evolutionary perspective. One example is things that increase the risk of an infectious disease such as spoiled foods, dead bodies, other forms of microbiological decomposition, a physical appearance suggesting sickness or poor hygiene, and various body fluids such as feces, vomit, phlegm, and blood. Another example is disgust against evolutionary disadvantageous mating such as incest (the incest taboo) or unwanted sexual advances. Still another example are behaviors that may threaten group cohesion or cooperation such as cheating, lying, and stealing. MRI studies have found that such situations activate areas in the brain associated with disgust.

See also
 Animal faith
 Evolutionary ethics
 The Origins of Virtue
 Moral foundations theory
 Moral progress
 Science of morality
 Triune ethics theory
 Veneer theory

References

Further reading

External links
 Evolution of Morality on PhilPapers
 Richard Dawkins video clip on morality
  Marc Hauser, Evolution of a Universal Moral Grammar,  Part 1, Part 2, Part 3
 Is morality innate? Brief video clip that examines whether infants have a sense or morality.
 Sam Harris: Can Science Help Determine what is Moral? Part 1, Part 2
 Jonathan Haidt on the Five foundations of morality
 Peter Swirski. "You'll Never Make a Monkey Out of Me or Altruism, Proverbial Wisdom, and Bernard Malamud's God's Grace." American Utopia and Social Engineering in Literature, Social Thought, and Political History. New York, Routledge, 2011.

Evolutionary biology
Evolutionary psychology
Sociobiology
Morality
Moral psychology